Da, Ta, or T’a (majuscule: Դ; minuscule: դ; Armenian: դա) is the fourth letter of the Armenian alphabet, representing the voiced alveolar plosive in Eastern Armenian and the aspirated voiceless alveolar plosive in Western Armenian. It is typically romanized with the letter D. It was part of the alphabet created by Mesrop Mashtots in the 5th century CE. In the Armenian numeral system, it has a value of 4.

Character codes

See also
 Gim, the letter preceding Da in the Armenian alphabet
 Armenian alphabet

References

External links
 Դ on Wiktionary
 դ on Wiktionary

Armenian letters
Armenian alphabet
Armenian language